The 1913 United States Senate election in New Jersey was held on January 28, 1913. Republican incumbent Frank O. Briggs ran for re-election to a second term, but was defeated by Democratic judge and former U.S. Representative William Hughes.

Prior to passage of the Seventeenth Amendment to the United States Constitution, New Jersey elected United States senators by a resolution of the New Jersey Legislature.

On September 24, 1912, direct "advisory" primaries were held. Hughes defeated former Senator James Smith Jr. and John McDermitt of Newark for the Democratic nomination, while Briggs easily won the Republican nomination. Thus, Hughes or Briggs stood likely to be elected Senator if their respective party won the 1910 fall legislative elections.

Republican primary

Candidates
Frank O. Briggs, incumbent Senator since 1907
Wescott

Results

Democratic primary

Candidates
William Hughes, Passaic County judge and former U.S. Representative
Frank M. McDermit, Newark resident and candidate for Senate in 1911
James Smith Jr., former U.S. Senator (1893–1899) and candidate for Senate in 1911

Results

Results

Senate

Assembly

Briggs, died just a few months later on May 8, 1913.  Hughes would not serve the complete term, dying January 30, 1918, just before the next scheduled election.

References

1913
New Jersey
United States Senate